Frank Dummerth (January 6, 1871 – August 7, 1936) was an American rower who competed in the 1904 Summer Olympics. He was born and died in St. Louis, Missouri. In 1904 he was part of the American boat, which won the bronze medal in the coxless four.

References

External links
 profile

1871 births
1936 deaths
Rowers at the 1904 Summer Olympics
Olympic bronze medalists for the United States in rowing
American male rowers
Medalists at the 1904 Summer Olympics